Amadeo Ignacio Daniel Francis Jr. (born 22 October 1931) is a Puerto Rican hurdler. He competed in the 400 metres hurdles at the 1952 Summer Olympics and the 1956 Summer Olympics. He later became the vice-president of the IAAF.

References

External links
 

1931 births
Living people
Athletes (track and field) at the 1952 Summer Olympics
Athletes (track and field) at the 1955 Pan American Games
Athletes (track and field) at the 1956 Summer Olympics
Puerto Rican male hurdlers
Olympic track and field athletes of Puerto Rico
Place of birth missing (living people)
Central American and Caribbean Games medalists in athletics
Pan American Games competitors for Puerto Rico